was a renowned Japanese photographer.

References

Japanese photographers
1939 births
1987 deaths